Mikael "Micke" Ljungberg (born 23 August 1961) is a Swedish curler.

In 2003 he was inducted into the Swedish Curling Hall of Fame.

Teams

Personal life

References

External links
 

Living people
1961 births
Swedish male curlers
20th-century Swedish people